Ensems (meaning "jointly, at the same time") is an annual contemporary classical music festival that takes place every spring in Valencia. Founded in 1978, it is the oldest contemporary music festival in Spain. It centers mostly in chamber music due to budget restrictions.

Works by composers such as John Cage, Elliott Carter, Brian Ferneyhough, Hans Werner Henze, Helmut Lachenmann, Krzysztof Penderecki, Salvatore Sciarrino or Iannis Xenakis have been given their Spanish premiere throughout the festival's history.

Editions

2009
 Subject: Me falta una oreja (I lack an ear)

2010

 Subject: Pop
 Composers

2011

 Subject: Love Songs
 Composers

References
  El País

Music festivals in Spain
Contemporary music organizations
Valencian culture